An ethnic stereotype, racial stereotype or cultural stereotype involves part of a system of beliefs about typical characteristics of members of a given ethnic group, their  status, societal and cultural norms. A national stereotype, or national character, does the same for a  given nationality. The stereotyping may be used for humor in jokes, and/or may be associated with racism. 

National stereotypes may relate either to one's own ethnicity/nationality or to a foreign/differing one.  Stereotypes about one's own nation may aid in maintaining a national identity due to a collective relatability to a trait or characteristic.

Examples

According to an article by The Guardian titled "European Stereotypes: What Do We Think of Each Other and Are We Right?", the Europe stereotype towards Britain is as "drunken, semi-clad hooligans or else snobbish, stiff free marketers", their view towards France is "cowardly, arrogant, chauvinistic, erotomaniacs", and they see Germany as "uber-efficient, diligent [and] disciplined". To Europe, Italy is "tax-dodging, Berlusconi-style Latin lovers and mama's boys, incapable of bravery", Poland is "heavy-drinking ultracatholics with a whiff of antisemitism", and Spain is "macho men and fiery women prone to regular siestas and fiestas". While some countries such as Germany proudly own their stereotype, others like Spain argue that theirs is a warped view based on experiences while on holiday instead of having actually lived there.

A Pew Global survey of the European countries United Kingdom, France, Germany, Spain, Italy, Greece, Poland, and Czechia found that European stereotypes found Germany to be both the most hardworking and least corrupt, Greece to be the least hardworking, and Italy to be the most corrupt. Five out of the eight countries thought their own country was the most corrupt.

Yanko Tsvetkov has designed many maps which serve as pictorial representations of such stereotypes, giving an impression of how certain regions of the world may view others. They have named such as "The Arab Winter" and "Crystal Ball View Of Europe In 2022".

Validity

It is sometimes held that such stereotypes often contain a grain of truth. However an extensive study by the personality psychologist Robert R. McCrae of the National Institute on Aging and colleagues found that they are generally untrustworthy.

Various anti-national phobias and prejudices operate with ethnic stereotypes.

Ethnic stereotypes are commonly portrayed in ethnic jokes, some of which some consider to be offensive to varying degrees. Richard M. Steers and Luciara Nardon, in their book about the global economy, use a variant of the "You have two cows" joke to illustrate the concept of cultural differences:
 Russian company: You have two cows. You drink some vodka and count them again. You have five cows. The Russian Mafia shows up and takes however many cows you have.
 Californian company: You have a million cows. Most of them are illegals.

They write that such jokes are considered funny because they are realistic caricatures of various cultures, and the pervasiveness of such jokes stems from the significant cultural differences. Steers and Nardon also state that others believe that cultural stereotypes in jokes of that kind must be viewed with caution.

See also
 Mores
 National character studies
 National personification
 Objectification of people
 Racial profiling
 Racial stereotyping in advertising
 Racism
 Stereotypes about indigenous peoples of North America
 Stereotypes of Americans
Stereotypes of groups within the United States
 Stereotypes of Hispanic and Latino Americans
 Stereotypes of African Americans
 Stereotypes of Jews
 Stereotypes of South Asians
 Stereotypes of East and Southeast Asians in the United States
 An Englishman, an Irishman and a Scotsman joke

References

Further reading
 Alí, Maurizio. (2010). Medios de comunicación, asuntos étnicos e intercultura en Colombia. En Revista Razón y Palabra, 74 (nov.2010/ene.2011). México DF: ITESM Campus Estado de México. ISSN 1605-4806.
 Macrae CN, Stangor C, Hewstone M.(eds.) "Stereotypes and stereotyping." Guilford Press, 1996.

 Pawel Milicki, Naomi Ellemers, Being different or being better?, European Journal on Social Psychology, vol. 26, 1996, pp.97-114

 National Stereotypes and Product Evaluations in a Socialist Country (journal article)
 Ethnic and National Stereotypes: The Princeton Trilogy Revisited and Revised (journal article)
 National Stereotypes: Correct Images and Distorted Images, ed. Blanca Valota, 2007, 
 National Stereotypes: an Educational Challenge (book)
 Haiti and the United States: National Stereotypes and the Literary Imagination (book)

 
National identity
Race and society
Racism